Harper's Dictionary of Classical Literature and Antiquities is an English-language encyclopedia on subjects of classical antiquity.

Publication history
It was edited by Harry Thurston Peck and published 1898 by Harper & Brothers in New York City. A 1965 reprint runs to 1,750 pages.

The dictionary's contents are now in the public domain.

References

External links
The dictionary is accessible online in various formats:

 Perseus Digital Library at uchicago.edu
 Perseus Digital Library at chlt.org
 Perseus Digital Library at tufts.edu (with illustrations)

Reference works in the public domain
 
1898 non-fiction books
Harper & Brothers books
American encyclopedias
Encyclopedias of history